Valeriy Volodymyrovych Yevdokimov (born 17 November 1969) is a Ukrainian major general. He was the Head of the Foreign Intelligence Service of Ukraine from 20 September 2019 until 4 June 2020.

Biography 
Yevdokimov graduated from the Institute of Border Troops, the National Academy of the Security Service and the Kyiv-Mohyla Business School.

Yevdokimov served in the Border Troops, the State Security Administration and the State Border Guard Service.

From 9 July to 20 September 2019 Yevdokimov was Deputy Head of the Foreign Intelligence Service of Ukraine.

On 20 September 2019 President Volodymyr Zelensky appointed Yevdokimov Head of the Foreign Intelligence Service. He was appointed member of the NSDC on 15 October 2019.

President Zelensky replaced Yevdokimov as Head of the Foreign Intelligence Service with Valeriy Kondratyuk on 5 June 2020.

Awards 
 Order of Danylo Halytsky (2017).
 Decoration of the President of Ukraine “For Participation in the Anti-Terrorist Operation”.

References

External links 
 

1969 births
Living people
National University of Kyiv-Mohyla Academy alumni
21st-century military personnel
Major generals of Ukraine
People of the Foreign Intelligence Service of Ukraine
National Security and Defense Council of Ukraine
Recipients of the Order of Danylo Halytsky
Ukrainian generals
Ambassadors of Ukraine to Tajikistan
Military personnel from Rivne